Waadeland is a Norwegian surname. Notable people with the surname include:

Carl Haakon Waadeland (born 1952), Norwegian musician and musicologist
Gudrun Waadeland (1937–2020), Norwegian actress and theatre director

Norwegian-language surnames